Ugu is a town in Uttar Pradesh, India.

Ugu or UGU may also refer to:

Places
Ugu Island (Ugu-shima), a small islet in Hakata Bay, Japan
Mount Ugu, a mountain in the Philippines
Ugu District Municipality, a district of KwaZulu-Natal province, South Africa

Food and culture
Telfairia occidentalis, an African leaf-vegetable
Ugu, a week in the Balinese Pawukon calendar
Ugu, a Cherokee high-priest's title of the ancient Kituwa settlement, North Carolina, United States
Ugu the Shoemaker, a fictional villain from the Oz books by L. Frank Baum
, a catch phrase uttered by Kanon character Ayu Tsukimiya

Other uses 
UGU, a genetic codon sequence of cysteine
Upper Gneiss Unit, a structural unit in geology (plate tectonics), see Thiviers-Payzac Unit 
Zugapa Airport, Indonesia (IATA airport code: UGU)
University of Glamorgan Union, Treforest, Wales
University Graduates Union, the founding non-profit organization of the Palestine Polytechnic University, Hebron, Palestine

See also
Ugwu (disambiguation)